The Yuzhno Khilchuyu Oil Field is an oil field located in Timan-Pechora Basin. It was discovered in 2008 and developed by Lukoil. The oil field is operated and owned by Lukoil.

References 

Oil fields of Russia